Eligio Cervantes Islas (born December 17, 1974 in Mexico City, Mexican Federal District) is an athlete from Mexico, who competes in triathlon. Cervantes competed at the second Olympic triathlon at the 2004 Summer Olympics. He placed thirty-eighth with a total time of 1:59:27.81.

References
 

1974 births
Living people
Sportspeople from Mexico City
Mexican male triathletes
Triathletes at the 2003 Pan American Games
Triathletes at the 2004 Summer Olympics
Olympic triathletes of Mexico

Central American and Caribbean Games gold medalists for Mexico
Central American and Caribbean Games silver medalists for Mexico
Competitors at the 2002 Central American and Caribbean Games
Competitors at the 2006 Central American and Caribbean Games
Central American and Caribbean Games medalists in triathlon
Pan American Games competitors for Mexico
20th-century Mexican people